Ramzi Khoury (born June 3, 1978), also known as RAmez, is a French rap artist of Lebanese descent. He sings  in French, English and Arabic.  In 2007 at a time where few people believed French Rap had a place in the Middle East, Ramez makes it to the NRJ Lebanon Top 100 by reaching number 24  with his hit song Leich Heik Baladé a song mixing French and Arabic.

Discography
Albums:
Le Monde est à refaire2001
Leich Heik Baladé2007
Canvas2010

Compilations:
My world 2001
Songs from the edge2001
 A trip to Rozz-well2002
Oto10dakt 2007

References

External links
 http://www.ramezonline.com RAmez - The First Lebanese French rapper
 https://web.archive.org/web/20080416041348/http://www.noun.com.lb/htd/musiq.html
 https://web.archive.org/web/20090112050230/http://www.lebjournal.com/newz/?p=1408
 http://www.nrjlebanon.com/onair/20-Archive.htm
 https://www.youtube.com/watch?v=mljF0ZjWQyg

1978 births
Living people
French people of Lebanese descent
French rappers